Weehaw Rice Mill Chimney  is a historic rice mill chimney located near Georgetown, Georgetown County, South Carolina. This rice mill chimney is significant as one of seven known extant rice mill chimneys in Georgetown County.  It is associated with Weehaw, on the Black River, which was one of the earliest successful rice plantations in the area.  The chimney is approximately 35 feet high.

It was listed on the National Register of Historic Places in 1988.

References

Chimneys in the United States
Agricultural buildings and structures on the National Register of Historic Places in South Carolina
National Register of Historic Places in Georgetown County, South Carolina
Buildings and structures in Georgetown County, South Carolina